The Budget of the United States Government Fiscal Year 1999

The United States Federal Budget for Fiscal Year 1999 (FY99) was a spending request by President Bill Clinton to fund government operations for October 1998–September 1999. It was the first balanced Federal budget in 30 years. In FY99, revenues were 1.82 trillion dollars. Spending was 1.70 trillion dollars, the surplus was $124 billion, and the GDP was 9.2 trillion.

Total Receipts

(in billions of dollars)

Total Outlays
Outlays by budget function
(in millions)

References

External links
 Status of Appropriations Legislation for Fiscal Year 1999
Budget of the United States Government, Fiscal Year 1999

1999
1999 in American politics
United States federal budget